Topla Primary School (Bengali: টোপলা প্রাইমারী স্কুল) is an old and heritage primary school of Nadia district, in the state of West Bengal, India. It is situated at Topla village, under Thanapara police station in Nadia.

History 
This school was established in the year 1901 in British India. Topla Primary School is one of the oldest primary school of the district which was started by the British Government. The school was under the Karimpur New Circle, of Nadia District District Inspector of School (Primary Education).

References

Schools in Nadia district
Schools in Colonial India
Primary schools in West Bengal
Educational institutions established in 1901
1901 establishments in British India